Mehetabel was the name of two minor biblical figures.

 The wife of Hadar (Genesis 36:39)
 A patriarch (Nehemiah 6:10)

The name in Hebrew means 'how good is God' or 'has done good to us'.

Mehetabel is also a given name. Notable people with the name include:

 Mehetabel Newman (1822–1908), New Zealand missionary and teacher
 Mehetabel Wesley Wright (1697–1750), English poet, the fourth daughter of Samuel Wesley (father of John and Charles Wesley).

References